is a 2011 2D arcade fighting game developed by Team Arcana (the first three updates co-developed with Examu (formerly Yuki Enterprise)) and published by Arc System Works. It is the third entry in the Arcana Heart series, following the events of Arcana Heart 2.

The game went through location tests in Japan starting in late 2009, and was officially released on console on January 13, 2011. PQube released an English version in Europe on August 19, 2011, for both the Xbox 360 and the PlayStation 3. An American (PlayStation Network only) version was released on April 19, 2011, by Aksys Games.

An update for the game, called , with rebalanced gameplay and new game modes was released in Japan on May 8, 2013, for Arcades, and later released for PlayStation Vita, PlayStation 3 and Microsoft Windows.

Gameplay 

Arcana Heart 3 continues the series' usage of Arcana or celestial beings based on the characters from the Tarot. In addition to the 23 playable characters, the 23 Arcana each have their own unique powers, to augment the abilities of the girls.

The game adds a Force Gauge to the fighting system. When completely filled, the Force Gauge allows the player to perform an Extend Force, a maneuver similar to the Arcana Burst from earlier games. The game also adds a "Simple Mode" which simplifies the control layout into a single button for each major function: one button for normal attacks, one button for special moves, one button for moves involving Arcana, and one button for the game's Homing Dash ability. The console versions have a fully voiced story mode and HD anime graphics for super moves. The game also includes a training mode, score attack, and online play.

Synopsis
The game's setting takes place in a fictional, somewhat futuristic Japan combined with fantasy elements. In the previous game, Arcana Heart 2, a dimensional distortion occurred in the country's Kanto region, caused by the primordial being known as Angelia Avallone. This event came to be known as the "Great Kanto Incident". The international Holy Spirit Institutions suffered harshly after the "Great Kanto Incident", but restoration has begun and about two months have elapsed.

In this time, a family that had received technical assistance during the war in Europe created "The Drexler Institution" to resume its activities around the world. The Drexler Institution was hiding in Japan. Western Europe was devastated by the Office of the Holy Spirit led by Mildred who had since defected. The West Branch of the Holy Spirit Rosenberg Agency had to be completely reconstituted. Shortly thereafter, a large number of dimensional distortions were observed throughout Japan. "Drexler" was a little unusual and unnatural with its authority behind the scenes too. Japan embarked on a convergence of the Holy Office to gain control of the situation. They were looking closely into part of an area in Japan that educates several "Maidens". This newcomer given the ability of a "Maiden" had begun her activities from the branch in Rosenberg. With the authority acquired from Drexler, a major order had been given to sink the entirety of Japan after six days.

Characters

Arcana Heart 3 released with a cast of 23 playable characters, with twenty returning from previous games in the series and three new playable characters (and corresponding Arcana). The Love Max Six Stars!!!!!! update introduced the fourth character on release. As part of a stretch goal of the Kickstarter campaign for the Steam release of Love Max Six Stars!!!!!!, two more new character were added for Love Max Six Stars Xtend!!!!!! alongside one yet to be announced character.

Introduced in Arcana Heart 3 

 is the last and newest of the three main protagonists of the game, alongside Heart Aino and Petra Johanna Lagerkvist. She is a girl working in a secret company named "Valkyria", a branch of the Drexler Institute. She is sent to investigate the cause of the catastrophe that is happening around and to stand on one's own. Little is known about her. Her Arcana is Gottfried, the Arcana of Sword, an artificial Arcana called a Geist which takes its name from Gottfried Feder. Drexler has developed an armored Holy Spirit inspired by the Norse war god Tyr.

, the secondary antagonist of the game, is another one of the young girls trained by the Drexler Institute, much like Weiß. However, Scharlachrot stands against her in an extremely obsessive manner bordering on dependence. After the organization was taken down by Petra, Scharlachrot went missing. However, she reappears in order to oppose Weiß and the rest of the cast. Despite being freed from Drexler's brainwashing in After Story, her psychotic side is still lingering within her as a side-effect result. She is the mid-boss character of the game. Her Arcana is Baldur, the Arcana of Fang who is also a Geist. It shares its name with Baldur von Schirach. The Drexler Institute-based Baldur on Fenrir, the massive wolf from Norse mythology.

 (Eko) (Kazu)
 is a girl who has the unique ability to move energy into something so that it can move on its own, which she mainly focuses on drawings. She shares a mutually dependent relationship with her "brother," , which resembles a large child's drawing. Since Petra had destroyed some of these "protection organizations", not much was known of Eko after that. She does seem to want to find Petra so that they can draw and play together. Eko's Arcana is Saligrama, the Arcana of Luck, which resembles a spirit with a die inside.

 is the main antagonist and final boss of the game. It is the ultimate creation of the Drexler Institute, a giant artificial Arcana created to resemble Gottfried. Due to its huge size, its powers were beyond the usual Arcana.

Introduced in Love Max Six Stars!!!!!! 

Minori is an “Hybride”, a special Valkyrie who can dually wield the powers of the Arcana and the Geist (armored spirits developed at the Drexler Institute). She escaped the facility with the help of Petra. “Doing good deeds in secrecy” is her motto, so she uses her ability to defeat evil without being seen. The dragonhead-like armor on her arms is the Geist of Fafnir and Schwarz. Her Arcana is Ichor, the Arcana of Blood. It symbolizes the essence of life. The Mobius strip represents the reincarnation of all life and enhances all potentials to their maximum strength. She replaces Ragnarok as the final boss on Love Max Six Stars!!!!!!.

Introduced in Love Max Six Stars Xtend!!!!!! 

A "shark girl" creature brought to life by the influence of Parace L'sia, who become her Arcana, just as Mildred being Angelia's. Her nickname is “Peace”, and she is Parace's 29th experiment series.

A girl from a dark future who closely resembles the protagonist Heart Aino, but both polar opposite than her and somehow harbors a deep hatred against her, due to believing that she would possibly enact a tragedy in the former's timeline.

True by her nature as regular Heart's opposite, Dark Heart's Arcana is Love Prison Geist. However, at a time when Xtend was first released, Dark Heart initially don't have her respective Arcana in this updated title at a moment.

An ancient angel who sealed herself a long time ago, due to her power was too great to be released. She is planned to be the main antagonist and final boss of the recently planned "World Extinction" Arc.

Release

Arcana Heart 3: Love Max!!!!!

An update for the game, called , was released with rebalanced gameplay and survival and training modes added (previously, only available in consoles), was released in Japan on May 8, 2013, for Arcades. A home port of Arcana Heart 3 Love Max!!!!! was released for the PlayStation 3 and PlayStation Vita on May 29, 2014. A version for Microsoft Windows was released worldwide on September 29, 2015.

Arcana Heart 3: Love Max Six Stars!!!!! 
Another update for the game, called , was released in arcade systems on December 4, 2014, and was released on Microsoft Windows worldwide on December 13, 2017, after a successful Kickstarter campaign, and after the passing of the series' writer, Tohru Sakurai on May 15, 2017. This update includes balance patches and added a new character, Minori Amanohara.

Arcana Heart 3: Love Max Six Stars Xtend!!!!! 
An update to the original Love Max Six Stars!!!!!, called , was released on Microsoft Windows worldwide on April 30, 2021. This update includes balance patches, and new characters who were originally meant to be downloadable characters in the original Love Max Six Stars!!!!!. Some of these downloadable characters were part of the crowdfunding via Kickstarter during the release of original Love Max Six Stars!!!!!, which ended between July 5 until 8 August, 2017.

An arcade port was announced at JAEPO 2023 to be released on eXA-Arcadia system around Spring 2023.

Reception

On release, Famitsu scored both the PS3 and Xbox 360 versions of the game a 27 out of 40 each. Toshimichi Mori, an Arc System Works employee and designer of BlazBlue series, stated in an interview that over 50,000 units of the game have been shipped. Metacritic also gave the game a 6.4/10.

Play magazine said, "the kiddy exterior masks a surprisingly complex game that rewards investment." GameSpot was that the game was "a fun fighter with a lot to offer". while the PlayStation Official Magazine said there was "a massively deep fighter hidden here".

The updated Arcana Heart 3: Love Max received a Famitsu score of 28/40 for both the Vita and PS3 platforms. Hardcore Gamer gave the Vita version of the game a 4/5.

References

External links
Arcana Heart 3 Love Max!!!!!
 and European official websites
Arcana Heart 3 Love Max Six Stars!!!!!!

2009 video games
Arc System Works games
Arcade video games
Arcana Heart
Cancelled Nintendo 3DS games
Fighting games used at the Super Battle Opera tournament
Fighting games
Multiplayer and single-player video games
NESiCAxLive games
PlayStation 3 games
PlayStation Network games
PlayStation Vita games
PQube games
Science fantasy video games
Video games developed in Japan
Video games featuring female protagonists
Video games set in Japan
Video games set in Massachusetts
Video games with alternative versions
Windows games
Xbox 360 games
Examu games
ja:アルカナハート